Death anxiety is anxiety caused by thoughts of one's own death, and is also referred to as thanatophobia (fear of death).  Individuals affected by this kind of anxiety experience challenges and adversities in many aspects of their lives. Death anxiety is different from necrophobia, which refers to irrational or disproportionate fear of dead bodies or of anything associated with the death. 

Psychotherapist Robert Langs proposed three different causes of death anxiety: predatory, predator, and existential. In addition to his research, many theorists such as Sigmund Freud, Erik Erikson, and Ernest Becker have examined death anxiety and its impact on cognitive processing.

Death anxiety has been found to affect people of differing demographic groups as well, such as men versus women, young versus old, etc.   

Anxiety caused by recent thought-content, about death, which sometimes is classified by a psychiatrist in a clinical setting as morbid or abnormal, or a combination of the two. This classification pre-necessitates a degree of anxiety which is persistent and interferes with everyday functioning. This high level of death anxiety in the elderly (who perceive themselves as close to death), can cause lower ego integrity, more physical problems as well as an increase in psychological problems.

Death anxiety can cause a person to become extremely timid or distressed when discussing anything to do with death.

Findings from one systematic review demonstrated that death anxiety features across several mental health conditions.

One meta-analysis of psychological interventions targeting death anxiety showed that death anxiety can be reduced using cognitive behavioral therapy.

Types 
Robert Langs distinguishes three types of death anxiety:

Predatory death anxiety 
Predatory death anxiety arises from the fear of being harmed. It is the oldest and most basic form of death anxiety, with origins in the first unicellular organisms' set of adaptive resources. Unicellular organisms have receptors that have evolved to react to external dangers, along with self-protective, responsive mechanisms made to increase the likelihood of survival in the face of chemical and physical forms of attack or danger. In humans, predatory death anxiety is evoked by a variety of dangerous situations that put one at risk or threaten one's survival. Predatory death anxiety mobilizes an individual's adaptive resources and leads to a fight-or-flight response, consisting of active efforts to combat the danger or attempts to escape the threatening situation.

Predation or predator 
Predation or predator death anxiety is a form that arises when an individual harms another, physically and/or mentally. This form of death anxiety is often accompanied by unconscious guilt. This guilt, in turn, motivates and encourages a variety of self-made decisions and actions by the perpetrator of harm to others.

Existential 
Existential death anxiety stems from the basic knowledge that human life must end. Existential death anxiety is known to be the most powerful form of death anxiety. It is said that language has created the basis for existential death anxiety through communicative and behavioral changes. Other factors include an awareness of the distinction between self and others, a full sense of personal identity, and the ability to anticipate the future. The existential psychiatrist Irvin Yalom asserts that humans are prone to death anxiety because "our existence is forever shadowed by the knowledge that we will grow, blossom, and inevitably, diminish and die."

Human beings are the only living things that are truly aware of their own mortality and spend time pondering the meaning of life and death. Awareness of human mortality arose some 150,000 years ago. In that extremely short span of evolutionary time, humans have fashioned a single basic mechanism through which they deal with the existential death anxieties this awareness has evoked: denial. Denial is effected through a wide range of mental mechanisms and physical actions, many of which go unrecognized. While denial can be adaptive in limited use, excessive use is more common and is emotionally costly. Denial is the root of such diverse actions as breaking rules, violating frames and boundaries, manic celebrations, directing violence against others, attempting to gain extraordinary wealth and power, and more. These pursuits are often activated by a death-related trauma, and while they may lead to constructive actions, more often than not they lead to actions that are damaging to self and others.

Theories

Thanatophobia 
The term thanatophobia stems from the Greek representation of death, known as Thanatos. Sigmund Freud hypothesized that people express a fear of death as a disguise for a deeper source of concern. He asserted the unconscious does not deal with the passage of time or with negations, which do not calculate the amount of time left in one's life. Under the assumption people do not believe in their own deaths, Freud speculated it was not death people feared. He postulated one does not fear death itself, because one has never died. He suspected death related fears stem from unresolved childhood conflicts.

Thanatophobia is not only death anxiety, but can mean an intense fear, feelings of overall dread in relation to one's thinking about death. Usually it relates to their personal death. Death anxiety can mean fear of death, fear of dying, fear of being alone, fear of the dying process, etc. Different people experience these fears in differing ways. Klein in 1948 states that humans are the only species that have a sense of what the limitations associated with life are, and because of this, death is a cause of anxiety. There continues to be confusion on whether death anxiety is a fear of death itself, or a fear of the process of dying.

Those who are moving towards death will undergo a series of stages. In Kubhler-Ross's book On Death and Dying (1969), she describes these stages thus: 1) denial that death is soon to come, 2) resentful feelings towards those who will yet live, 3) bargaining with the idea of dying, 4) feeling depressive due to death being inescapable, 5) finally, acceptance.

Wisdom: ego integrity vs. despair 
Developmental psychologist Erik Erikson formulated the psychosocial theory that people progress through a series of crises as they grow older. The theory also envelops the concept that once an individual reaches the last stages of life, they reach the level he called "ego integrity". Ego integrity is when one comes to terms with one's life and accepts it. It was also suggested that when a person reaches the stage of late adulthood, they become involved in a thorough overview of their life to date. When one can find meaning or purpose in one's life, one has reached the integrity stage. Reversely, when an individual views their life as a series of failed and missed opportunities, they do not reach the ego integrity stage. People who have attained this stage of ego integrity are believed to exhibit less death anxiety.

Terror management theory 

Ernest Becker based his terror management theory (TMT) on existential views that added a new dimension to previous death anxiety theories. His theory states that death anxiety is not only real, but also people's most profound source of concern. He described the anxiety as so intense that it can generate fears and phobias of everyday life—like fears of being alone, or in confined spaces. According to Becker, many everyday human behaviors consist of attempts to deny death and to keep anxiety under strict regulation.

His theory suggests that as an individual develops mortality salience, or becomes more aware of the inevitability of death, they will instinctively try to suppress this thought out of fear. This behavior may range from simply thinking about death to the development of severe phobias and desperate behavior.

Religiosity can play a role in death anxiety through the concept of fear. There are two major claims concerning the interplay of fear and religion: that fear motivates religious belief, and that religious belief mitigates fear. From these, Ernest Becker and Bronislaw Malinowski developed what is called "Terror Management Theory." According to Terror Management Theory, humans are aware of their own mortality which, in turn, produces intense existential anxiety. To cope with and ease the produced existential anxiety, humans will pursue either literal or symbolic immortality. Religion often falls under the category of literal immortality, but at times, depending on the religion, can also provide both forms of immortality. It is theorised that those who are either very low or very high in religiosity experience much lower levels of death anxiety, whereas those with a very moderate amount of religiosity experience the highest levels of death anxiety. One of the major reasons that religiosity plays such a large role in Terror Management Theory, as well as in similar theories, is the increase in existential death anxiety that people experience. Existential death anxiety is the belief that everything ceases after death; nothing continues on in any sense. Seeing how people deeply fear such an absolute elimination of the self, they begin to gravitate toward religion which offers an escape from such a fate. According to one specific meta-analysis study that was performed in 2016, it was shown that lower rates of death anxiety and general fear about dying were experienced by those who went day-to-day living their religion and abiding by its practices, compared to those who merely label themselves as members of a given religion, without living according to its doctrines and prescribed practices.

A 2009 study on death anxiety in the context of religion showed that Christians scored lower for death anxiety than non-religious individuals, which supports the main tenets of terror management theory, that people pursue religion to avoid anxiety about death by finding comfort in the ideas about afterlife and immortality. Interestingly, the study also found that Muslims scored much higher than Christians and non-religious individuals for death anxiety. These findings do not support terror management theory, as the belief in an afterlife caused more anxiety for the Muslim participants than those with no belief in an afterlife. This finding highlights a need for further examination into TMT in the context of different religions/sects as well as the impact of varying beliefs about afterlife on levels of death anxiety.

Heidegger's being-for-death 
The German philosopher Martin Heidegger wrote about death as something conclusively determined, in the sense that it is inevitable for every human being, while on the other hand, it unmasks its indeterminate nature via the truth that one never knows when or how death is going to come. Heidegger does not engage in speculation about whether being after death is possible. He argues that all human existence is embedded in time: past, present, future, and when considering the future, we encounter the notion of death. This then creates angst. Angst can create a clear understanding in one that death is a possible mode of existence, which Heidegger described as "clearing". Thus, angst can lead to a freedom about existence, but only if people can stop denying their mortality (as expressed in Heidegger's terminology as "stop denying being-for-death").

The American philosopher Sidney Hook criticized Heidegger's view of death anxiety in his review of Heidegger's book Being and Time when it was translated into English in 1962. Hook noted that for Heidegger, death anxiety "is a primordial anxiety, not something that waxes and wanes with changes in nature, history or society", and the anxiety is about "the possibility that one's existence may at any moment become finally impossible". Hook argued that Heidegger's claims were wrong:

Meaning management theory 
Paul T. P. Wong's work on the meaning management theory indicates that human reactions to death are complex, multifaceted and dynamic. His "Death Attitude Profile" identifies three types of death acceptance as Neutral, Approach, and Escape acceptances. Apart from acceptances, his work also represents different aspects of the meaning of death fear that are rooted in the bases of death anxiety. The ten meanings he proposes are finality, uncertainty, annihilation, ultimate loss, life flow disruption, leaving the loved ones, pain and loneliness, prematurity and violence of death, failure of life work completion, judgment and retribution centered.

Existential theories 
The existential approach, with theorists such as Rollo May and Viktor Frankl, views an individual's personality as being governed by the continuous choices and decisions in relation to the realities of life and death. Rollo May theorized that all humans are aware of the fact that they must one day die, reminiscent of the Latin adage memento mori. However, he also theorized that humans must find meaning in life, which led to his main theory on death anxiety: that all humans face the dichotomy of finding meaning in life, but also confronting the knowledge of approaching death. May believed that this dichotomy could lead to negative anxiety that hindered life, or a positive anxiety that would lead to a life full of meaning and living to one's fullest potential and opportunities.

Other theories 
Other theories on death anxiety were introduced in the late part of the twentieth century. Another approach is the regret theory which was introduced by Adrian Tomer and Grafton Eliason. The main focus of the theory is to target the way people evaluate the quality and/or worth of their lives. The possibility of death usually makes people more anxious if they feel that they have not and cannot accomplish any positive task in the life that they are living. Research has tried to unveil the factors that might influence the amount of anxiety people experience in life.

Personal meanings of death 

Humans develop meanings and associate them with objects and events in their environment which can provoke certain emotions. People tend to develop personal meanings of death which could be either positive or negative. If the formed meanings about death are positive, then the consequences of those meanings can be comforting (for example, ideas of a rippling effect left on those still alive). If the formed meanings about death are negative, they can cause emotional turmoil. Depending on the certain meaning one has associated with death, positive or negative, the consequences will vary accordingly. The meaning that individuals place on death is generally specific to them; whether negative or positive, and can be difficult to understand as an outside observer. However, through a Phenomenological perspective, therapists can come to understand their individual perspective and assist them in framing that meaning of death in a healthy way.

Religiosity 

A 2012 study involving Christian and Muslim college-students from the US, Turkey, and Malaysia found that their religiosity correlated positively with an increased fear of death.

A 2017 review of the literature found that in the US, both the very religious and the not-at-all religious enjoy a lower level of death anxiety and that a reduction is common with old age.

A 2009 study on death anxiety in the context of religion showed that Christians scored lower for death anxiety than non-religious individuals, which supports the main tenets of terror management theory, that people pursue religion to avoid anxiety about death by finding comfort in the ideas about afterlife and immortality. Interestingly, the study also found that Muslims scored much higher than Christians and non-religious individuals for death anxiety. These findings do not support terror management theory, the belief in an afterlife for muslims in the study caused more anxiety than those with no belief in an afterlife. This finding highlights a need for further examination into TMT in the context of different religions/sects as well as the impact of varying beliefs about afterlife on levels of death anxiety.

A 2019 study further examined the aspect of religiosity and how it relates to death and existential anxiety through the application of supernatural agency. According to this particular study, existential anxiety relates to death anxiety through a mild level of preoccupation that is experienced concerning the impact of one's own life or existence in relation to its unforeseen end.  It is mentioned how supernatural agency exists independently on a different dimensional plane than the individual and, as a result, is seen as something that cannot be directly controlled. Oftentimes, supernatural agency is equated with the desires of a higher power such as God or other major cosmic forces. The inability for one to control supernatural agency triggers various psychological aspects that induce intense periods of experienced death or existential anxiety.  One of the psychological effects of supernatural agency that is triggered is an increased likelihood to attribute supernatural agency toward causality when dealing with natural phenomena.  Seeing how people have their own innate form of agency, the attribution of supernatural agency to human actions and decisions can be difficult. However, when it comes to natural causes and consequences where no other form of agency exists, it becomes much easier to make a supernatural attribution of causality.

Death acceptance and death anxiety 
Researchers have also conducted surveys on how being able to accept one's inevitable death could have a positive effect on one's psychological well-being, or on one's level of individual distress. A research study conducted in 1974 attempted to set up a new type of scale to measure people's death acceptance, rather than their death anxiety. After administering a questionnaire with questions regarding the acceptance of death, the researchers found there was a low-negative correlation between acceptance of one's own death and anxiety about death; meaning that the more the participants accepted their own death, the less anxiety they felt. While those who accept the fact of their own death will still feel some anxiety about it, this acceptance could allow them to form a more positive perspective on it.

People who are exposed to those who are near-death, or people who have already passed on seem to have a paradigm shift in their way of thinking death.

A more recent longitudinal study asked cancer patients at different stages to fill out different questionnaires in order to rate their levels of death acceptance, general anxiety, demoralization, etc. The same surveys administered to the same people one year later showed that higher levels of death acceptance could predict lower levels of death anxiety in the participants.

Death row phenomenon 

The death row phenomenon is the distress and anxiety seen in inmates awaiting execution, which can cause an increased risk for suicidal tendencies and psychotic delusions. A contributing factor to this phenomenon is solitary confinement, lack of social interaction, as well as the psychological impact as a result of their crimes. One study collected data on death row suicides from 1978 to 2010 and found the rate of death row suicides to be higher than suicides in the male prison population as well as males in society, regardless of the increase in supervision of death row inmates.

Children 
Death anxiety typically begins in childhood. The earliest documentation of the fear of death has been found in children as young as age 5. Psychological measures and reaction times were used to measure fear of death in young children. Recent studies that assess fear of death in children use questionnaire rating scales. There are many tests to study this including The Death Anxiety Scale for Children (DASC) developed by Schell and Seefeldt. However the most common version of this test is the revised Fear Survey Schedule for Children (FSSC-R). The FSSC-R describes specific fearful stimuli and children are asked to rate the degree to which the scenario/item makes them anxious or fearful. The most recent version of the FSSC-R presents the scenarios in a pictorial form to children as young as 4. It is called the Koala Fear Questionnaire (KFQ). The fear studies show that children's fears can be grouped into five categories. One of these categories is death and danger. This response was found amongst children age 4 to 6 on the KFQ, and from age 7 to 10. Death is the most commonly feared item and remains the most commonly feared item throughout adolescence.

A study of 90 children, aged 4–8, done by Virginia Slaughter and Maya Griffiths showed that a more mature understanding of the biological concept of death was correlated to a decreased fear of death. This may suggest that it is helpful to teach children about death (in a biological sense), in order to alleviate the fear.

Relationship to adult attachment 
There has been much literature that supports the existence of a correlation between one's state of coping skills, mental health, emotions and cognitive reactions to stressful events, and one's ability to regulate affect concerning one's death anxiety. A series of tests determined that significantly high levels of death anxiety tend to occur in close relationships with an intimate partner (more so amongst females than males).

Sex 
The connection between death anxiety and one's sex appears to be strong. Studies show that females tend to have more death anxiety than males. In 1984, Thorson and Powell did a study to investigate this connection, and they sampled men and women from 16 years of age to over 60. The Death Anxiety Scale, and other scales such as the Collett-Lester Fear of Death Scale, showed higher mean scores for women than for men. Moreover, researchers believe that age and culture could be major influences in why women score higher on death anxiety scales than men.

Through the evolutionary period, a basic method was created to deal with death anxiety and also as a means of dealing with loss. Denial is used when memories or feelings are too painful to accept and are often rejected. By maintaining that the event never happened, rather than accepting it, allows an individual more time to work through the inevitable pain. When a loved one dies in a family, denial is often implemented as a means to come to grips with the reality that the person is gone. Closer families often deal with death better than when coping individually. As society and families drift apart so does the time spent bereaving those who have died, which in turn leads to negative emotion and negativity towards death. Mothers hold greater concerns about death due to their caring role within the family. It is this common role of women that leads to greater death anxiety as it emphasize the 'importance to live' for her offspring. Although it is common knowledge that all living creatures die, many people do not accept their own mortality, preferring not to accept that death is inevitable, and that they will one day die.

Age and Gender 
Using the Collett-Lester Fear of Death scale, studies can be performed to examine the age and gender effects on death anxiety. In 2007, two studies were compared to support these claims and they discovered the evidence that was needed. The studies claim that death anxiety peaks in men and women when in their 20s, but after this group, gender plays a role in the path that one takes. Both genders can experience a decline in death concerns with age, but the studies show an unexpected second spike in women during their early 50s. Once the age of 60 is reached for both genders, death anxiety levels seem to decrease and stabilize to a low level.

From a study done on elderly men and women in a care facility they were able to see that many older people were not as worried about what happens to their soul beyond death, but more, what they will have to go through in order to get to that process. In relation to their personal health/deterioration, self esteem, etc. From this study, it was also seen that women seem to be more concerned with others they will be leaving behind and the loss of those around them, in many cases even more-so than themselves.

Measuring 
There are many ways to measure death anxiety and fear. In 1972, Katenbaum and Aeinsberg devised three propositions for this measurement. From this start, the ideologies about death anxiety have been able to be recorded and their attributes listed. Methods such as imagery tasks to simple questionnaires and apperception tests such as the Stroop test enable psychologists to adequately determine if a person is under stress due to death anxiety or post-traumatic stress disorder.

The Lester attitude death scale was developed in 1966 but not published until 1991 until its validity was established. By measuring the general attitude towards death and also the inconsistencies with death attitudes, participants are scaled to their favorable value towards death.

One systematic review of 21 self-report death anxiety measures found that many measures have problematic psychometric properties.

Death anxiety and COVID-19 
Millions of people around the world have died from COVID-19 during the ongoing COVID-19 pandemic. Those who fear that they are more prone to contracting and dying from COVID-19 have higher levels of death anxiety and are more susceptible to general psychological disturbances such as depression, anxiety, stress, and paranoia. Elderly individuals, who were already likely to experience death anxiety outside of a pandemic situation, now find their fear of death largely exacerbated. The fear of dying from COVID-19 has also been one of the leading factors in psychological distress among many countries during the course of the pandemic. It has particularly affected women and those with a lower level of education. During the COVID-19 pandemic, death anxiety has been a large contributor to declining mental wellbeing among those working in helping professions such as nursing and social work.

See also 
 Human condition
 The Denial of Death

References

Bibliography 

Death
Phobias
Philosophy of life
Religion and mental health